The Elmcroft Estate, also called the Norwich House, is a historic mansion in Upper Brookville, New York, U.S. The 38-room property was built in 1918 by industrialist Frank C B Page, president of E W Bliss Machine Works in Brooklyn NY. From 1938 to 1952 it was the residence of Nathan L. Miller, who served as the Governor of New York from 1921 to 1922. In 1952, it was purchased by the Soviet Union as a retreat for their diplomats. Russian access to the site was commuted in the wake of the alleged Russian interference in the 2016 United States elections as part of a number of sanctions taken by the United States government against Russian diplomatic personnel.

See also
 Pioneer Point, Maryland, another recreational retreat in the United States owned by the Russian government

References

1918 establishments in New York (state)
Houses completed in 1918
Oyster Bay (town), New York
Soviet Union–United States relations
Russia–United States relations
Mansions of Gold Coast, Long Island
Russian ambassadorial residences